The Aqsab Mosque (English: Mosque of the Sugarcanes) is an Ayyubid-era mosque in Damascus, Syria. It is on Suq Sarujiyya outside the walls of the old city, near the Bab al-Salam gate.

References

Bibliography

Mosques completed in 1234
13th-century mosques
Ayyubid mosques in Syria
Architecture in Syria
Mosques in Damascus
Buildings and structures inside the walled city of Damascus